Hugh Greenwood (born 6 March 1992) is a professional Australian rules footballer who plays for North Melbourne Football Club in the Australian Football League (AFL) and a former basketball player with the University of New Mexico. Greenwood was a promising under-16 footballer, but opted to attempt a career in basketball in 2008, moving to the United States in 2011 to play for the University of New Mexico. Greenwood returned to Australia in 2015 and joined the Perth Wildcats of the National Basketball League, but abruptly announced his retirement from basketball to sign with the Adelaide Football Club as a category B rookie in September 2015. He moved to the Gold Coast Suns in 2019.

Early life and career
Born and raised in Hobart, Tasmania, Greenwood attended Lauderdale Primary School and MacKillop College. He was a talented junior footballer, representing Tasmania at the national under-16 championships in 2007. The following year, however, he accepted a basketball scholarship at the Australian Institute of Sport (AIS) and moved to Canberra. He spent four years at the AIS and represented their SEABL team between 2008 and 2010. Following the team's withdrawal from the SEABL in 2011, Greenwood joined the Hobart Chargers for the 2011 season.

After winning Basketball Australia's Junior Male Player of the Year in 2008, Greenwood joined the Australian Boomers for their 2009 program. At 17 years and 4 months, he was the youngest athlete on the squad. He later made his debut for the Australian Emus under-19 basketball team at the 2009 FIBA Under-19 World Cup, in New Zealand. Two years later, he helped the Emus to a sixth-place finish at the 2011 FIBA Under-19 World Cup, in Latvia. He averaged 17.1 points, 4.0 rebounds and 2.6 assists per game, and was one of five players named to the All-Tournament Team. He helped Australia win its group with a 5–1 record, and finished 6-3 in the tournament overall. He also scored a tournament-best 26 points against the United States.

College career

In April 2011, Greenwood signed a National Letter of Intent to play college basketball for the University of New Mexico. He joined the Lobos program for the 2011–12 season.

Freshman year
As a freshman in 2011–12, Greenwood earned Academic All-Mountain West Conference selection. The Lobos won the Mountain West Tournament title and reached the third round of the 2012 NCAA Tournament. Greenwood scored a season-high 22 points in 19 minutes against Air Force on 8 March 2012, which marked his first 20+ point performance of his career. In 33 games, he averaged 6.3 points, 3.7 rebounds and 2.5 assists in 23.2 minutes per game.

Sophomore year
As a sophomore in 2012–13, Greenwood earned Honorable Mention All-Mountain West and repeated as an Academic All-Mountain West selection. He was also named to Bob Cousy Collegiate Point Guard of the Year Award Watch List. He started every game for the Lobos as a sophomore, and led the team in steals with 47. He had a season-best game in win against Boise State on 16 January 2013, recording 15 points and a team-high seven rebounds, all while battling the flu. He also hit a layup to send the game into overtime, where he scored five points in the extra period to clinch the win. The Lobos once again won the Mountain West regular-season and tournament titles, and reached the second round of the 2013 NCAA Tournament. In 35 games, he averaged 7.0 points, 5.0 rebounds, 2.4 assists and 1.3 steals in 28.5 minutes per game.

Junior year
As a junior in 2013–14, Greenwood earned All-Conference Honorable Mention for a second consecutive season and Academic All-Mountain West for a third consecutive season. He finished sixth in assist-to-turnover ratio in the NCAA with 105 assists and 30 turnovers (3.5 asst-to). He also recorded 105 assists after tallying 83 as a freshman and as a sophomore. On 21 January 2014, he scored a season-high 20 points against Boise State for his second 20+ point game of his career. The Lobos won the Mountain West Tournament title for a third straight year and once again reached the second round of the NCAA Tournament. In 31 games, he averaged 6.2 points, 5.1 rebounds and 3.4 assists in 31.8 minutes per game.

Senior year
As a senior in 2014–15, Greenwood earned Academic All-Mountain West (fourth straight year), NABC All-District Second Team, and All-Mountain West Third Team honours. During the season, he became the 33rd Lobo to reach the 1,000-point career mark. He also became the 17th Lobo in program history to reach 1,000 points and 500 rebounds, and joined Lamont Long as the only guards in program history with 1,000 points and 600 rebounds. Greenwood graduated top ten in Lobo history in career minutes played (3,843), assists (372) and made three-point field goals (187). On 20 November 2014, he scored a career-high 24 points against Boston College in the ESPN Puerto Rico Tip-Off. On 21 January 2015, he scored 22 points on six made three-pointers and had eight rebounds against UNLV. During the game, he had his first dunk since his freshman year. He scored in double figures in 18 games, with five of those games being 20-point performances. After dominating the Mountain West Conference for three seasons, Greenwood and the Lobos were knocked out in the first round of the 2015 Mountain West Tournament. In 31 games, he averaged 11.6 points, 5.3 rebounds, 3.3 assists and 1.5 steals in 35.3 minutes per game.

Professional basketball career
After earning a pre-draft workout invite from the Utah Jazz in May 2015, Greenwood signed a three-year contract with the Perth Wildcats of the Australian National Basketball League on 1 June 2015. The following month, Greenwood joined an Australian squad for the 2015 World University Games in Gwangju, South Korea.

With preseason training beginning on 3 August 2015, Greenwood impressed in his first week as a Wildcat, coming away with great results in a series of performance tests. However, on 20 August 2015, Greenwood departed the Wildcats to pursue a career in the Australian Football League (AFL).

AFL career
While at New Mexico, Greenwood was approached by several AFL teams, but he knocked them back to continue with basketball. By mid-August 2015, however, Greenwood had lost the motivation to play basketball and subsequently retired from the game to pursue AFL. After training with the Adelaide Football Club for two weeks, Greenwood signed a two-year category B rookie contract with the club on 4 September 2015.

In 2016, Greenwood made a smooth transition into the Crows' State League side after an eight-year hiatus from competitive football. He played every game of the season, impressing in roles through the midfield and half-forward. He showed strong physicality and developed his ball skills throughout the year, averaging 16 disposals and kicking 25 goals from 21 games, and helped the club reach the SANFL finals for the first time. As a result, he finished sixth in the State League Club Champion award.

On 10 May 2017, the Crows promoted Greenwood to their senior list as possible cover for the concussed Tom Lynch, naming him as an emergency for their Round 8 clash. A week later, the Crows named Greenwood to make his debut on 20 May 2017 against the Brisbane Lions at the Gabba. In his debut, he kicked three first-half goals and finished with 15 disposals, two marks and nine tackles in helping Adelaide defeat Brisbane 140–60. Greenwood quickly became an important part of Adelaide's midfield and impressed in his first season at AFL level, having a mature body and kicking with high efficiency. He was a member of the Crows' 2017 Grand Final side.

The trade was finalised on 15 October 2019.

On 11 July 2021, Greenwood sustained a suspected ACL injury to his right knee.

After the 2021 AFL season, as a list measure, the Suns delisted Greenwood with the intent to re-draft him.

Statistics
Statistics are correct to the end of the 2021 season.

|- style=background:#EAEAEA
! scope="row" style="text-align:center" | 2017
|style="text-align:center;"|
| 20 || 15 || 9 || 4 || 114 || 124 || 238 || 37 || 99 || 0.6 || 0.3 || 7.6 || 8.3 || 15.9 || 2.5 || 6.6
|- 
! scope="row" style="text-align:center" | 2018
|style="text-align:center;"|
| 1 || 22 || 16 || 17 || 206 || 178 || 384 || 54 || 145 || 0.7 || 0.8 || 9.4 || 8.1 || 17.5 || 2.5 || 6.6
|- style=background:#EAEAEA
! scope="row" style="text-align:center" | 2019
|style="text-align:center;"|
| 1 || 14 || 11 || 5 || 119 || 120 || 239 || 34 || 84 || 0.8 || 0.4 || 8.5 || 8.6 || 17.1 || 2.4 || 6.0
|-
| scope=row | 2020 ||  || 21
| 17 || 3 || 4 || 173 || 130 || 303 || 27 || bgcolor=CAE1FF | 117† || 0.2 || 0.2 || 10.2 || 7.7 || 17.8 || 1.6 || bgcolor=CAE1FF | 6.9†
|- style=background:#EAEAEA
| scope=row | 2021 ||  || 1
| 15 || 6 || 6 || 153 || 110 || 263 || 25 || 130 || 0.4 || 0.4 || 10.2 || 7.3 || 17.5 || 1.7 || bgcolor=CAE1FF | 8.7†
|- class="sortbottom"
! colspan=3| Career
! 83
! 45
! 36
! 765
! 662
! 1427
! 177
! 575
! 0.5
! 0.4
! 9.2
! 8.0
! 17.2
! 2.1
! 6.9
|}

Personal
Greenwood is the son of Mike and Andree Greenwood. His father played water polo and his mother played basketball. Greenwood's sister, Josie, also played college basketball at New Mexico. Greenwood's grandfather, Peter Marquis, won three consecutive VFL premierships with Melbourne between 1955 and 1957.

In 2015, his mother was diagnosed with terminal secondary breast cancer. He subsequently started a charity to raise funds for the UNM Cancer Center in honour of his mother, which received over $50,000 in donations throughout the course of the senior season. Andree was surrounded by her family in Tasmania when she died of breast cancer on 23 October 2017.

Notes

References

External links

Hugh Greenwood at golobos.com
Hugh Greenwood at fiba.com

1992 births
Living people
Adelaide Football Club players
Gold Coast Football Club players
North Melbourne Football Club players
Australian men's basketball players
Australian expatriate basketball people in the United States
Australian Institute of Sport basketball players
New Mexico Lobos men's basketball players
Point guards
Shooting guards
Australian rules footballers from Hobart